The cycling competitions of the 2020 Summer Olympics in Tokyo featured 22 events in five disciplines. 

Cycling competitions had been contested in every Summer Olympics programme since the first modern Olympiad in 1896 alongside athletics, artistic gymnastics, fencing and swimming.

Since the 1896 contests which featured five track events and an 87 km road race from Athens to Marathon and back, Olympic cycling had gradually evolved to include women's competitions, mountain bike and BMX to arrive at the current 22 events.

The cycling program for this edition was expanded with 4 more events than those held in 2016. BMX freestyle was added in the program for the first time and there will also be a return of Madison events on the track that had been removed from the Olympic program in 2008. The award of the extra events was widely seen as a reward for the agreement of the UCI that the track cycling and mountain bike events be taken out of Tokyo and held in Izu, Shizuoka, allowing for significant costs savings to the organising committee. As Izu was not covered by the state of emergency imposed by the Japanese government, cycling was one of the very few sports at these games that allowed a limited number of local spectators to attend.

Great Britain's stranglehold on the velodrome events slackened for the first time since 2008, with their three golds matched by the Netherlands and six other golds shared among six nations. They also failed to win a road medal for the first time since 2004. Nevertheless, with three golds, three silvers and a bronze inside the velodrome, and a hugely successful mountain bike and BMX campaign outside it (three golds, a silver and a bronze from the six events) for the fourth Olympics in a row, Great Britain topped the medal table in cycling with twelve medals, six gold, closely followed by the Netherlands with twelve medals but five golds. Between them the two top nations won half of all the 22 gold medals on offer in cycling; no other nation won more than one, and aside from 12 medals won by each of the 'Big 2', only the Swiss managed more than three medals in total, thanks to their dominance of the mountain bike podium (winning 4 medals from 6).

During the Games, Jason Kenny and Laura Kenny respectively took the records for the most successful male and female Olympic cyclists in history, Jason with a seventh gold in men's keirin, and Laura with a fifth in women's madison. They also became their nation's most successful male and female Olympians in history.

Venues
Track cycling was planned for a temporary venue in Ariake. To save $100 million in construction costs, it was announced after months of negotiations that the venue for track cycling would be the existing velodrome in Izu.

The International Cycling Union (UCI) resisted moving track cycling 120 km outside Tokyo to Izu. The UCI feared it would detract from the Olympic experience for both athletes and fans. Eventually, the UCI agreed to change. The Japanese Cycling Federation and local authorities committed to establishing at Izu a multi-sport cycling center, to create local cycling programs, and to develop the cycling sport.

For road cycling the start and finish were originally planned at the Imperial Palace Garden. Later it was announced that the finishes would be at the Fuji International Speedway with the starts of the road races at the Musashinonomori Park.

Qualification

Japan, as the host country, received one guaranteed quota place per gender in the BMX Racing, BMX Freestyle, and mountain bike events and two quota places per gender in the road race events (there are no guaranteed places in the road time trial or any track events).

Most of the qualification was done through UCI ranking lists, with some spots allocated through world championship events or continental qualification events.

Participation

Participating nations

Courses

Time trials

Road races
The courses for the men's and women's road races were revealed in August 2018. The races started in Musashinonomori Park in Chofu, western Tokyo with the finish at the Fuji Speedway circuit in the Shizuoka prefecture.

The men's road race was 234 kilometres long with a total elevation of 4865 m. The women's race was 137 km long with a total elevation of 2692 metres.<ref name="course"

The first part of the men's and women's races is identical. The course first passes through the mostly flat outskirts of Tokyo's metropolitan area. After 80 km there is a long climb on Doushi Road with a total elevation of 1000 m. After reaching Lake Yamanakako in Yamanashi and crossing the Kagosaka Pass there is a fast 15 km descent. From here the courses are different for men and women.

After the descent, the men's race heads towards the lower slopes of Mount Fuji, Japan's highest mountain, with a 14.3 km long climb with a 6.0% average incline. The riders then head to the Fuji Speedway section, where they  cross the finish line twice before entering the last part of the race, which includes the Mikuni Pass peak at about 30 km to go. This climb is 6.8 km at a height of 1159 metres with an average incline of 10.2% including sections reaching 20%. After the climb, the race returns to Lake Yamanakako and the Kagosaka Pass before finishing on the Fuji Speedway circuit.

The women's race does not include the two tough climbs at Mount Fuji and Mikuni Pass. Instead, the race remains on the Fuji Speedway circuit, where the women ride 1.5 laps before the final crossing of the finish line.

Competition schedule

Competitors

Medalists

Medal table

Road cycling

Track cycling

Men's

Women's

Mountain biking

BMX

See also

Cycling at the 2018 Asian Games
Cycling at the 2018 Commonwealth Games
Cycling at the 2018 Summer Youth Olympics
Cycling at the 2019 African Games
Cycling at the 2019 European Games
Cycling at the 2019 Pan American Games
Cycling at the 2020 Summer Paralympics

References

External links
 Results book – Cycling BMX Freestyle 
 Results book – Cycling BMX Racing 
 Results book – Cycling Mountain Bike 
 Results book – Cycling Road 
 Results book – Cycling Track 

 
2020 Summer Olympics events
2020
Olympics
Olympics
Cycle races in Japan
BMX at the Summer Olympics